Austropeplea is a genus of air-breathing freshwater snails, aquatic pulmonate gastropod mollusks in the family Lymnaeidae, the pond snails.

Species 
Species within the genus Austropeplea include:
 Austropeplea hispida (Ponder & Waterhouse, 1997)
 Austropeplea lessoni (Deshayes, 1830)
 Austropeplea ollula
 Austropeplea tomentosa (L. Pfeiffer, 1855) - the type species of the genus Austropeplea
 Austropeplea viridis (Quoy & Gaimard, 1832) - synonym: Lymnaea viridis

References

External links 
 Vinarski V. M. (2013) "One, two, or several? How many lymnaeid genera are there?" Ruthenica 23(1): 41-58.

Lymnaeidae